Nickel Mountain is a 1984 drama film produced in Iceland and the United States written and directed by Drew Denbaum. It stars Michael Cole, Heather Langenkamp, Patrick Cassidy, Grace Zabriskie, and Brian Kerwin. The movie is based on the novel of the same title by American novelist John Gardner.

Plot
Henry Soames owns a rural diner, and has befriended Willard Freud and Callie Wells. One day Willard and Callie get the news that Callie is pregnant, and Willard leaves her. Henry takes in Callie, and helps her through the pregnancy. They fall in love and get married. All is going well until Willard is back from the road and wants the baby.

Cast
 Michael Cole as Henry Soames 
 Heather Langenkamp as Callie Wells
 Patrick Cassidy as Willard Freund 
 Brian Kerwin as George
 Grace Zabriskie as Ellie Wells 
 Don Beddoe as Doc Cathey
 Ed Lauter as W.D. Freund
 Cotter Smith as Trucker
 Harry Northup as Frank
 Julia Montgomery as Delivery Nurse
 Liz Sheridan as Reception Nurse
 Peter Hobbs as Dr. Costard

Release
The film had a limited release in Tulsa, Oklahoma.

Home video release
Nickel Mountain was released to videotape in the mid 1980s.

References

External links
 
 
 

American drama films
English-language Icelandic films
1984 films
Icelandic drama films
1984 drama films
1980s English-language films
1980s American films